Dark Matter is the second studio album by guitarist Brett Garsed, released independently on 29 June 2011. It was first made available as a digital download on iTunes and CD Baby, followed by a CD release on Garsed's official website.

Track listing

Personnel
Brett Garsed – guitar, mixing, production
Gerry Pantazis – drums (except track 1)
Virgil Donati – drums (track 1)
Ric Fierabracci – bass, mixing, production
Craig Newman – bass (track 9)

References

Brett Garsed albums
2011 albums
Self-released albums